The 2010 Worthing Borough Council election took place on 6 May 2010 to elect members of  Worthing Borough Council in West Sussex, England. One third of the council was up for election and the Conservative Party stayed in overall control of the council.

After the election, the composition of the council was:
Conservative: 25
Liberal Democrat: 12

Election result

Ward results

References

2010 English local elections
May 2010 events in the United Kingdom
2010
2010s in West Sussex